Goodtime Charley is a musical with a book by Sidney Michaels, music by Larry Grossman, and lyrics by Hal Hackady.

A humorous take on actual historical events, it focuses on the Dauphin of France, who evolves from a hedonistic young man enamored of women in general (and Joan of Arc in particular) into a regal king while Joan follows her voices to her tragic fate.

Background
The show was originally announced under the title "Charley and Joan", with Al Pacino and Barbara Harris as the intended leads. It underwent extensive changes throughout its development stage, especially when Joel Grey expressed interest in playing the lead. The script and score were rewritten significantly in order to tailor the piece to his personality and talents. The producers were so keen on casting Ann Reinking as Joan they put everything on hold while she recovered from a back injury she had sustained while performing in Over Here!. The delay would prove to be damaging, since Grey had been signed for the film Buffalo Bill and the Indians and had limited time to commit to the stage project.

Productions
The out-of-town tryout in Boston resulted in major cuts in order to trim the running time from three-and-a-half hours to a more reasonable ninety minutes before the show continued to Philadelphia, where the reviews were now "raves", and finally New York City.

The musical opened on Broadway on March 3, 1975 at the Palace Theatre, where it ran for only 104 performances and twelve previews, closing on May 31 when the producers were unable to find a name star to replace the departing Grey. The director was Peter H. Hunt, original choreography and staging concepts, Dennis Nahat (who brought in designers Willa Kim and Rouben Ter-Arutunian), replaced after Philadelphia by choreographer Onna White, with scenic design by Rouben Ter-Arutunian, costume design by Willa Kim, lighting design by Feder and orchestrations by Jonathan Tunick. The cast included Susan Browning, Richard B. Shull, Louis Zorich, and Grace Keagy.

42nd Street Moon, San Francisco, California, presented a staged concert version in its "Lost Musicals" series from June 5 to 23, 1996. This version, in consultation with Grossman and Hackaday, restored three songs that were cut prior to the Broadway premiere: "All She Can Do is Say No", "Tomorrow's Good Old Days", and "There Goes the Country" and returned the show to its original concept.

A New York City revival, starring Daniel Reichard, was presented at the Arclight Theatre in September 2001.

The York Theatre Company (New York) "Musicals in Mufti" series presented the musical as a staged concert from June 27, 2008 to June 29, featuring Jenn Colella (Joan) and Matt McGrath (Charley). The Beautiful Soup Theatre Collective in New York presented it as a benefit reading in March 2012.

An original cast recording was released by RCA.

Song list   

Act I      
 History
 Goodtime Charley
 Voices & Visions 
 Bits and Pieces
 To Make the Boy a Man
 Why Can't We All Be Nice?
 Born Lover
 I Am Going to Love
 Castles of the Loire
 Coronation

Act II      
 You Still Have a Long Way to Go
 Merci, Bon Dieu
 Confessional
 One Little Year
 I Leave the World

Awards and nominations

Original Broadway production

References

External links
Internet Broadway Database listing
New York Public Library blog on 'Goodtime Charley'
'Goodtime Charley' plot and songs at guidetomusicaltheatre.com

1975 musicals
Broadway musicals